Bassermann is a surname. Notable people with the surname include:

Albert Bassermann (1867–1952), German actor 
Elsa Bassermann (1878-1961), German screenwriter, stage and film actress
 (1854–1917), German politician
Friedrich Daniel Bassermann (1811–1855), German politician 
Hans Bassermann (1888–1978), German violinist and music scholar
Heinrich Bassermann (1849–1909), German theologian
Julie Bassermann (1860-1940), German women's rights activist

Surnames of German origin
de:Bassermann